The black-bellied slender salamander (Batrachoseps nigriventris) is a small species of salamander that is endemic to California.

Distribution
This salamander prefers California chaparral and woodlands habitats of Coast live oak - Quercus agrifolia and California sycamore - Platanus racemosa.

Description
The black-bellied slender salamander is about 3.1 to 4.3 cm long. It has a worm-like body, a small head and small limbs, and a long cylindrical tail, often twice the length of its body.

The black-bellied slender salamander can have a black, tan, reddish, brown or beige dorsum often with a contrasting broad mid-dorsal stripe of similar colors. It has a purplish or black venter with fine light speckling over the entire surface.

This species will coil its body and tail when handled; it is fragile and easily injured.  Batrachoseps nigriventis looks similar to the related species Batrachoseps pacificus and Batrachoseps gabrieli.

References

  Database entry includes a range map and justification for why this species is of least concern
 This article is based on a description from "A Field Guide to the Reptiles and Amphibians of Coastal Southern California", Robert N. Fisher and Ted J. Case, USGS, http://www.werc.usgs.gov/fieldguide/index.htm.

Batrachoseps
Salamander, Black-Bellied Slender
Salamander, Black-Bellied Slender
Fauna of the California chaparral and woodlands
Amphibians described in 1869